Constance Rosenblum is an American newspaper editor, biographer, and author.

Her books include Gold Digger:  The Outrageous Life and Times of Peggy Hopkins Joyce, which was named an editor's choice by The New Yorker, and Boulevard of Dreams, a history of the Grand Concourse.  She is the editor of The New York Times City section.  She was the editor of the paper's Arts and Leisure section from 1990 to 1997.

Rosenblum grew up in Middletown, New York, and graduated from Emma Willard School and Bryn Mawr College.

References

American women journalists
Living people
American biographers
American newspaper editors
People from Middletown, Orange County, New York
Bryn Mawr College alumni
Historians from New York (state)
Women newspaper editors
Year of birth missing (living people)
Historians of New York City
American women biographers
Emma Willard School alumni
21st-century American women